Villanueva de Córdoba is a city located in the province of Córdoba, Spain. , the city has a population of 9,599 inhabitants. The city is located in Andalusia, southern Spain, close to the capital of the province of Córdoba.

References

External links
Villanueva de Córdoba - Sistema de Información Multiterritorial de Andalucía

Municipalities in the Province of Córdoba (Spain)